The Alton and Southern Railway  is a switching railroad in the Greater St. Louis area in  Illinois. It is a wholly owned subsidiary of the Union Pacific Railroad.

Overview 
The Alton and Southern Railroad was formed in 1910, and in 1913 it absorbed the Denverside Connecting Railway (founded in 1910), and the Alton and Southern Railway (founded in 1911).  The company was operated as a subsidiary of the Aluminum Ore Company, which was itself a subsidiary of the Aluminum Company of America (Alcoa), to serve the Bayer process bauxite-to-alumina refinery at Alorton, Illinois.

Alcoa sold the line to the Missouri Pacific Railroad and Chicago and North Western Railway (CNW) in 1968, and it was reorganized as the Alton and Southern Railway. In 1972, CNW's share was sold to the St. Louis Southwestern Railway. In 1982, the Union Pacific Railroad (UP) took ownership of the Missouri Pacific share and then became full owner in 1996 with the acquisition of SSW parent Southern Pacific Transportation Company.  The Alton and Southern is still a legally separate entity but is wholly owned by UP.

References
 Alton & Southern - Chronology – History of the A&S Railway

External links

 Alton & Southern – Official Website
 Railroad Picture Archives – Photographs of the Alton & Southern Railway

Illinois railroads
Union Pacific Railroad
Predecessors of the Union Pacific Railroad
Railway companies established in 1911
Railway companies disestablished in 1913
Railway companies established in 1968
Switching and terminal railroads
1968 establishments in Illinois
American companies established in 1911